Ghost City is a 1932 American western film directed by Harry L. Fraser and starring Bill Cody, Andy Shuford and Helen Foster. It was distributed by Monogram Pictures which specialized in low-budget second features, many of them westerns.

Cast
 Bill Cody as 	Bill Temple
 Andy Shuford as 	Andy Blane
 Helen Foster as Laura Martin
 Walter Miller as 	Jim Blane
 Thomas A. Curran as Piano Player 
 Kate Campbell as 	Ruby Blane
 Charles King as 	Buck
 Walter Shumway as 	Henchman
 Jack Carlyle as Henchman
 Si Jenks as 	Whiskey Pete

References

Bibliography
 Pitts, Michael R. Western Movies: A Guide to 5,105 Feature Films. McFarland, 2012.

External links
 

1932 films
1932 Western (genre) films
1930s English-language films
American Western (genre) films
Monogram Pictures films
Films directed by Harry L. Fraser
American black-and-white films
Films with screenplays by Harry L. Fraser
1930s American films